The 2017 Westchester County Executive election was held on November 6, 2013. Incumbent GOP County Executive Rob Astorino won re-election over Noam Bramson, the Mayor of New Rochelle and Democratic nominee, by a margin of 12 percentage points.

Primary elections

Democratic 
The Westchester County Democrats held a nominating convention at the Westchester County Center in White Plains on April 24, 2013. After none of the three candidates reached a majority in the first round, third place William Ryan was eliminated and voting continued into the early hours of April 25. In the end, Mayor of New Rochelle Noam Bramson emerged as the victor over runner-up Kenneth Jenkins, a county legislator.

First round results

Second round results

Republican 
Astorino was not opposed by another Republican thus the primary was cancelled.

General election

On November 6, 2013, Astorino defeated Bramson, 56%–44%. Bramson conceded by 10:30pm while Astorino celebrated at his watch party. As of 2022, this was the last time any Republican has won Westchester County.

References

2013 New York (state) elections